Papar is a minor Austronesian language spoken in Sabah, Malaysia.

References

External links 
 Materials on Karnai are included in the open access Arthur Capell collection (AC2) held by Paradisec.

Murutic languages
Languages of Sabah
Languages of Malaysia
Endangered Austronesian languages